Sam Toy  (21 August 1923 – 24 March 2008) was a British industrialist who was chair of Ford Motor Company UK from 1980 until 1986. He presided over Ford at a time it faced competition from British Leyland, and saw Ford make their last Cortina. Toy also led Ford UK through the difficult introduction of the Sierra in 1982, the MK3 Granada and the Orion.

After schooling at Falmouth Grammar School, he went to Selwyn College, Cambridge, to read Geography, but his studies were interrupted by the war. He later returned to Cambridge, transferring to Fitzwilliam College. After his retirement, he lived in Hampshire.

References

1923 births
2008 deaths
People from Mabe, Cornwall
Alumni of Selwyn College, Cambridge
Alumni of Fitzwilliam College, Cambridge
Fellows of Fitzwilliam College, Cambridge
Officers of the Order of the British Empire
Ford executives
English industrialists
People educated at Falmouth Grammar School
20th-century English businesspeople